Tender Feelin's is  the second album by American pianist and arranger Duke Pearson featuring performances originally recorded in 1959 and released on the Blue Note label in 1960.

In the liner notes, producer Alfred Lion recalls the off-the-cuff recording of "3 A.M.": "The session was over, and everybody was ready to pack up and the lights in the studio had been turned off. Then, Duke started to play the blues, with his hat on, and quickly Gene grabbed his bass and Lex got ready. In the control room, we got set, but fast, and this is the result."

Reception
The AllMusic review by Stephen Thomas Erlewine stated: "Tender Feelin's remains a wonderfully understated, romantic mainstream jazz record."

Track listing
All compositions by Duke Pearson, except as indicated.

 "Bluebird of Happiness" (Sandor Harmati, Edward Heyman, Harry Parr-Davies) – 4:19
 "I'm a Fool to Want You" (Joel Herron, Frank Sinatra, Jack Wolf) – 5:24
 "I Love You" (Cole Porter) – 4:33
 "When Sunny Gets Blue" (Marvin Fisher, Jack Segal) – 5:09
 "The Golden Striker" (John Lewis) – 5:24
 "On Green Dolphin Street" (Bronislau Kaper, Ned Washington) – 6:46
 "3 A.M." – 8:55

Recorded December 16 (tracks 6 & 7) and December 19 (tracks 1–5), 1959.

Personnel
Duke Pearson – piano
Gene Taylor – bass
Lex Humphries – drums, tambourine

References

Blue Note Records albums
Duke Pearson albums
1959 albums
Albums produced by Alfred Lion
Albums recorded at Van Gelder Studio